Bolshoy Begichev is an island in the Laptev Sea, in the Sakha Republic, Russia.

Geography
Bolshoy Begichev is located within the Khatanga Gulf, splitting the gulf into two straits.

Adjacent Islands

Maliy Begichev
Its size is only . The border between administrative divisions of the Russian Federation runs between the two Begichev islands, so that while Maliy Begichev is in Krasnoyarsk Krai, Bolshoy Begichev is in the Sakha republic.
Both Bolshoy Begichev and Maliy Begichev are named after Russian polar explorer Nikifor Begichev.

Preobrazheniya
North of Bolshoy Begichev lies small Preobrazheniya Island. This elongated granitic island was useful as a landmark for ships plying the Northern Sea Route in the past.

History
However, according to the NAVTEX list  the station was no longer listed.

Natural history

There are muskox on the island.

References

External links
  Around the Polar Circle by Motor Vehicle

Islands of the Laptev Sea
Islands of Krasnoyarsk Krai
Islands of the Sakha Republic